Where's Waldo? is a hidden object game developed by Bethesda Softworks and published by THQ for the Nintendo Entertainment System in 1991. It was the first video game loosely based on Martin Handford's 1987 book of the same name. Mostly similar to the books, players must help Waldo get to the Moon by finding him in each of the eight levels in the game.

The game was panned by critics, who criticized the game for its graphics, which made it more difficult to find Waldo in each of the levels.

Gameplay 

The player's goal is to help Waldo get to the Moon, by finding Waldo in various pictures in order to progress through the game.

There are eight levels in the game. In the picture levels, the directional buttons control a magnifying glass and that must be placed over Waldo in order to "find" him and move to the next level and a new picture. In the easy and practice mode, the pictures are still images the size of the screen in the levels. In the Medium and Hard modes, the player has to scroll to the side to see the rest of the area, and Waldo will change color to make it more challenging to find him in the picture levels.

In the Practice mode, there is no time limit, however only a select number of levels are open (the Train Station, Forest and Caves). The time limit for the other levels varies; On easy, the time limit is ten minutes, on medium, the time limit is seven minutes, and on hard, five minutes. Each time the game is played Waldo is moved to a new location in the scene.

Not all levels in the game have the same format of finding Waldo as in the other levels; in the cave level, the player must find Waldo in the dark. To help, Waldo will pop up briefly to give a clue where he is. In the subway level, the player must go through a maze and collect Waldo and his dropped glasses in order to exit the stage. The player must also avoid the Wizard Whitebeard, who can quickly subtract time if the player lands on his spot. In the final level, the player must match three pictures of Waldo in order to get him to the Moon.

Development 
Where's Waldo was programmed and designed by two Bethesda Softworks staff, Paul Coletta and Randy Linden, with the visuals done by Nancy Freeman; in an attempt to ease-up programming graphics using only character sets, Linden programmed a tool to draw bitmap graphics that would be converted into character sets that would be randomized every time the game was loaded up.

Reception 

Responses towards the game from reviewers were negative. One of the most known criticisms of the game is the graphics; some of the pixelated objects in each of the game's levels had similar colors and stripes of Waldo's shirt and in some levels Waldo would even change color, which made it hard to find him. Cracked.com said of Where's Waldo to have the worst graphics of any NES game: "There are many other graphically challenged games that were made, but this game takes the cake." Nintendo World Report, in addition to calling the graphics "boring," criticized its short game length and absence of music in the stages, negatively labeling it as nothing more than a pixel art collection.

ConsoleClassix.com said that, although fans of the book may enjoy the game a little, other players may get bored. In an issue of Game Informer, they have rated it a 1 out of 10, citing it as being "a game for those too lazy to turn a page." Writer Cyril Lachel of Defunct Games wrote: "It's hard to believe something this pointless came out of Bethesda Softworks... Where's Waldo? Hopefully in a landfill, because that's where this 8-bit piece of garbage belongs." A reviewer of Yahoo! Voices, who gave the game 0.5 out of 5 stars, even criticized the sound effects. Some reviewers also noted of the game's lack of replay value, such as in a review by Gamecola.net.

The game was listed #12 on Seanbaby's "Worst Nintendo Games".

The game was a hit according to THQ.

Sequel 

One year later, a sequel, The Great Waldo Search, was released on the Nintendo Entertainment System, Super Nintendo Entertainment System and Sega Genesis.  It was based on Where's Wally? The Fantastic Journey, the third book of the Where's Waldo? series. However, in 2009, a more modern remake of that sequel was developed by Ludia and published by Ubisoft on iOS, Microsoft Windows, Wii and the Nintendo DS. The remake especially takes advantage of superior pointer-based motion controls to easily locate search targets and supports versus multiplayer.

Notes

References

External links 

Where's Waldo? at GameFAQs

1991 video games
Bethesda Softworks games
Hidden object games
Nintendo Entertainment System games
Nintendo Entertainment System-only games
North America-exclusive video games
Single-player video games
THQ games
Video games based on Where's Waldo?
Video games scored by Julian Le Fay
Video games using procedural generation
Video games with oblique graphics
Works about space programs
Video games developed in the United States